Hopital Notre Dame S.A. This is a list of hospitals in Haiti.

Département de l'Ouest:
Hôpital adventiste d'Haïti, Port-au-Prince
Hôpital de la Trinité, Port-au-Prince
Hopital Notre Dame S.A., Pétion-Ville
Hôpital Sainte-Croix, Léogâne
Hôpital Camejo, Léogâne
Hôpital de l'Université d'État, Port-au-Prince
Hôpital du Canapé Vert, Port-au-Prince
Unité Chirurgicale, Pétion-Ville
Santa Madre Tuya
Hôpital Saint-Damien (Nos Petits Frères et Soeurs), Tabarre 
Hôpital Saint-François de Sales
Hôpital sentinel laboule Zone 1 HT6142
Hôpital Asile Français
Hôpital de la Communauté Haïtienne, Pétion-Ville
Hôpital Grâce pour Enfants, Port-au-Prince
Hospital Bernard Mevs Project Medishare, Port-au-Prince
Hôpital Espoir, Port-au-Prince
Hôpital Saint-Esprit, Port-au-Prince
Centre Hospitalier Sainte Marie Port-au-Prince 
Département du Nord:
Hôpital Universitaire Justinien, Cap-Haïtien
Hôpital Sacré Coeur, Milot - supported by the CRUDEM Foundation 
Hôpital Bon Samaritain, Limbé 
Alyans Sante Borgne, Borgne
Département de l'Artibonite:
Hôpital Albert Schweitzer, Deschapelles
Hôpital La Providence, Gonaïves
Hopital Notre Dame S.A., Gonaives
Hôpital Saint Nicolas, Saint Marc
Hôpital Bienfaisance de Pignon 
Hôpital Claire-Heureuse, Dessalines
Hôpital Camejo, Leogane
Centre Hospitalier Victor Binkley, Pierre Payen - Project Help Haiti
Département du Nord-Ouest:
Hôpital de Immaculée Conception, Port-de-Paix
Département du Sud-est:
Hôpital Saint-Michel de Jacmel
Département des Nippes:
Hôpital Sainte-Thérèse de Miragoâne
Département du Sud:
Hôpital Immaculée Conception, Les Cayes
Hopital Notre Dame S.A., Cayes
Hôpital Saint-Boniface, Fond des Blancs - supported by the St. Boniface Haiti Foundation
Département du Centre:
Zanmi Lasante, Cange
Hôpital Sainte-Thérèse de Hinche
 Hôpital Universitaire de Mirebalais, Mirebalais
Hôpital General Fraternite de Hinche, Hinche, Haiti
Departement de la Grand'Anse
Hôpital Sainte-Antoine de Jérémie

References

External links
 Haiti Medical Missions: Places of Service
 Haiti Medical: Hospitals in Haiti
 The Haiti Connection: List of Hospitals & Clinics in Haiti
 

 List
H
Haiti
Hospitals